ASK, also known as ASK Italian is a British casual dining restaurant chain that serves Italian cuisine in 120 locations in the UK.

The chain, founded by brothers Adam Kaye and Samuel Kaye in 1993, and floated on AIM in 1995, was the subject of a public-to-private deal in 2004, after which it was merged with Pizza Express
 to form Gondola Holdings, which was later part of the Gondola Group, and was acquired along with Zizzi for £250 million by Bridgepoint Capital in February 2015.

The name is made up of the founders' initials, Adam and Samuel Kaye. It is often mistakenly confused as an acronym for "Authentic Sicilian Kitchen".  ASK was the chain's original name, it was rebranded as ASK Italian from 2010.

Theo Randall
In 2010, Theo Randall started working with ASK Italian restaurants as their 'expert friend', developing menus and coming up with new dishes. In June 2015, he became an investor in the Azzurri Group, which owns and runs the restaurant chain.

Charity fundraising
Kiss It Better Campaign
ASK Italian partnered with Great Ormond Street Hospital Children's Charity in 2008 to donate £1 for every kids menu sold during the campaign, and by asking customers to add a £1 donation onto their bill. This raised £73,000 in four weeks. The chain went on to raise a further £200,000 for the charity in the following two years, including through celebrity cook book sales, a digital charity box and donations from a range of dishes.

Ownership
In February 2015, Bridgepoint Capital bought ASK Italian along with its sister brand Zizzi from Cinven in a transaction totalling £250 million.
It was later bought in 2020 by TowerBrook Capital Partners.

Controversies
In November 2015, the chain was one of seven restaurants surveyed that failed to meet a basic level of sustainability in its seafood.

In November 2019, Azzurri Restaurants admitted in court that a dish described as "lobster and king prawns" contained only 35% lobster, and had white fish and other ingredients mixed in and formed to appear as lobster meat. The dish was sold between 2014 and March 2019.

COVID-19 pandemic 
On 20 March 2020, all restaurants in the UK were closed indefinitely due to new rules regarding the national lockdown initiated by the government to reduce the spread of COVID-19. On 17 July 2020, Azzurri Group, owner of the Zizzi and ASK Italian chains, announced the closure of 75 restaurants with the loss of up to 1,200 jobs.

Works
 The ASK Italian Cookbook (2012)

See also
 List of Italian restaurants

References

External links

 

Italian restaurants in the United Kingdom
Restaurant groups in the United Kingdom
Restaurants established in 1993
1993 establishments in the United Kingdom